Jasmin Hagendorfer (also known as Hagendorfer) is a Vienna-based contemporary artist, writer, filmmaker, curator, producer and festival organizer. She is one of the founders and creative director of the Porn Film Festival Vienna. Since 2019 she is the creative director of Transition International Queer & Minorities Film Festival. Her main artistic interest is in installation, sculpture and performance, and her work has been exhibited in Austria, Germany, Turkey, Serbia and Greece. As an artist she is concerned with social and political discourses and questions about gender identity with an emphasis on post-porn political works. Her studio is based in Stockerau near Vienna.

As an art curator she creates events such as "Art Unanchored", an art festival that took place on a ship traveling between Vienna and Bratislava, and several queer art shows. She is often part of art and film award juries.

Her work as a founder and organizer of the Porn Film Festival Vienna focuses on conceptualizing the festival, creating artistic highlights and working on programming and outreach. Hagendorfer and her team, according to the Austrian mainstream press, are trying to bridge the gap between feminist and queer theory, art, and pornography.

She writes essays and articles, but also lectures on politics and technology, for example at Hackers on Planet Earth 2020 or TEDxVienna, and collaborates with activists like Menelas Siafakas.

Since 2019 she has been active as a film producer (e.g. the 2021 horror feature Masking Threshold by Johannes Grenzfurthner) and filmmaker. Her first film is the queer sci-fi comedy short Fudliaks! (2021).

Filmography
Fudliaks! (short film, 2021) - as director, writer, producer
Masking Threshold (feature, 2021) - as producer
Razzennest (feature, 2022) - as producer and assistant director
Hacking at Leaves (documentary feature, 2023) - as producer and assistant director

References

External links 

 
 Jasmin Hagendorfer, official site
 "How good porn can save the planet" (talk by Jasmin Hagendorfer at TEDxVienna 2021)
 Interview in IU Magazin with Jasmin Hagendorfer and Patrick Catuz
 Interview in Kosmo with Jasmin Hagendorfer, Gregor Schmidinger and Saif Rangwala

Living people
Artists from Vienna
21st-century Austrian artists
Austrian art curators
Feminist artists
Women performance artists
Queer artists
Austrian contemporary artists
Political artists
Film festival directors
Year of birth missing (living people)